Garimella Balakrishna Prasad (born 9 November 1948) is an Indian classical devotional singer, composer, Sangeet Natak Akademi for year 2020, T.T.D Asthana Vidwaan and Ahobhilamatam Asthana Vidwaan. He served Tirumala Tirupati Devastanam's Annamacharya Project as Special Grade Vocal Artiste from 1978 to 2006.

He is regarded as a pioneer in composing and rendering  Annamacharya Sankeerthanas in various Indian musical genres like classical, semi-classical, light and folk styles. He composed tunes for the lyrics of nearly 1200 songs composed by various poets. Of these nearly 800 of them were Annamacharya sankirtanas, and this is a record. To mention a few most popular sankeerthanas set to tune by Sri Prasad are Vinaro Bhagyamu Vishnukatha, Jagadapu Chanavula, Vachenu Alamelumanga, Tiruveedhula Merasi, Choodaramma Satulaala, Jayalakhmi Varalakshmi, Aadimoolame maaku angaraksha, Mangambudhi Hamumantha, Antayu neeve, Yemani pogadudume, Annimantramulu and Pidikita Thalambrala.

Early life
Balakrishna Prasad was born in Rajamundry, Andhra Pradesh to Krishnaveni and Narasimha Rao, a music teacher and a Vaggeyakara. He holds a Diploma in Carnatic Music. He is an 'A' grade vocal artist of the All India Radio (AIR).

He specialised in Annamacharya compositions under the tutelage of Sangita Kalanidhi, Lt . Sri Nedunuri Krishnamurthy, who initiated him into the nuances of classical music. He was closely associated with Nedunuri Krishnamurthy in not only learning music, but also in composing music to Annamacharya Sankeerthanas, publishing books with musical notation and audio CD recordings.

Prof. D. Pasupathi also taught Annamacharya songs as well as classical kritis during two-year scholarship course offered by Tirumala Tirupati Devasthanams. Dr. Mangalampalli Balamuralikrishna's music, mellifluous voice and unique rendering inspired Sri Balakrishna Prasad to learn classical music. Sri Balakrishna Prasad also received musical training from Dr. Mangalampalli Balamuralikrishna.

Performing career
He joined the Annamacharya Project after completing his diploma in Carnatic classical vocal music, in 1978 as a vocal artist. The project established to promote Annamacharya's music and literature, soon became the medium through which he was able to bring forth his musical prowess. From the inception till his retirement in 2006, he remained the principal exponent of Annamacharya Project. He rendered remarkable services at various levels to raise it into a top cultural organisation.

His Nadopasana spans over four decades. Absolute faith, total commitment and the zeal for perfection are hallmarks of his music. He consistently endeavours to improve his art and continues to grow as an artist.

He performed in more than five thousand vocal concerts, set tune to more than six hundred Annamacharya songs, gave audio recordings for TTD, published books with musical notations and conducted classes, teaching Annamacharya songs to make them more popular.

Unique contributions and records

 He is the inventor of "Sankeerthana Yagnam", a stage where a large number of songs are sung by a singer on a single stage, which spans for more than a day. Sankeerthana Yagnam's performed by Garimella Balakrishna Prasad: Visakhapatnam in the year 1997, Vijayawada in the year 1999 with more than 200 songs, Tirupati in the year 2001 with a record number of more than 300 songs, Hyderabad in the year 2003 and 2007 with more than 200 songs. Some of these were telecast by TV channels such as MAA TV, Bhakthi TV etc.
 He crossed the one hundred mark of teaching Annamacharya sankeerthans through "Hari Sankeerthanam", a program telecast on BHAKTHI TV (a sister concern of NTv), that targets teaching music to the common man. It is mentionable that his second son Sri GVN Anila Kumar has participated as student in this feature and thousands of music lovers are benefited by learning directly from Sri Balakrishna Prasad.
 "LAKSHA GALAARCHANA" is an extraordinary feature wherein Sri Balakrishna Prasad has led more than one lakh sixty thousand singers all across India on a single day, 10 May 2008, at Parade grounds, Secunderabad. This feature is conducted by "SILICON ANDHRA" (a US based organisation) in co-ordination with Andhra Pradesh (A.P.) State Government and Tirumala Tirupati Devasthanam (T.T.D). This feature is telecast in live simultaneously by many TV Channels in India and abroad.
 More than 5000 concerts by a singer with Annamacharya sankeerthanas.
 More than 700 songs set to tune by a music composer for a lyricist.
 Tirumala Tirupati Devasthanams has honoured Sri Balakrishna Prasad with a certificate of appreciation in the year 2006 for his extra ordinary service
 Being a Vaggeyakara he has penned sankeerthanas on lord Anjaneya "ANJANEYA KRITI MANI MALA" (21 kritis), on lord Ganesha (50 kritis), Navagrahas, Light music songs and on other lords. His own compositions are more than 1000 in number. Some of them are published as books with musical notations.

Personal life
He is married to G.Radha and has two sons – G.S.Pavana Kumar married to Srividya, G.V.N.Anila Kumar married to Swarna. He is the nephew of playback singer S. Janaki.

Discography

Annamacharya Sankeerthanas, T.T.D Recordings

 Annamayya Sri Venkateswara Geethamalik
 Desi Kavitaa Gaanam
 Tatva neeti Saaram
 Annamayya Venkatadri Vennela
 Annamayya Sankeerthana Lahari
 Annamayya Hari Saranagati
 Annamayya Ramanjaneya Lahari
 Annamayya Hari Sankeerthanamrutam
 Annamayya Haripada Makarandam
 Annamayya Anantaraagaalu
 Palukutenala Talli ( 2 volumes)
 Annamayya Sankeerthana Palavelli
 Sri Raamaanjaneyam
 Srinivasa Sruti Bhushanam
 Annamayya Venkatadri Nrusimhudu

 Annamayya Alivelumanga Vilasam
 Annamayya Sankeerthana Gnanayagnam
 Annamayya Nrusimha sankeerthanam
 Annamayya Sankeerthana Taarakam
 Annamayya Sankeerthana Prabha
 Annamayya Sankeerthana Brundaavanam
 Annamayya Sankeerthana Prasaadam
 Annamayya Haripada Sirulu
 Nrusimha pada dwani
 Annamayya Mohana Muraari
 Sankeertana Sravani
 Sankeertana Kusumaanjali
 Pada Tirtham (songs by Tadigonda Vengamaamba)
 Tirupati sri kodanda raama hanumath sankeertanalu (tunes of Sri Balakrishna Prasad)
 Annamayya sri Pranayam

Annamacharya Sankeerthanas, Other recordings

 Annamayya Paarijaatalu
 Annamayya Sankeerthana Sudha
 Bhavayaami
 Annamayya sankeerthana chandrika
 Annamayya Pada Madhuri
 Annamayya Sankeerthana Pushpaalu
 Annamayya Sankeerthana Pushpayaagam
 Tirunivaali
 Annamayya Pada Madhuri
 Srihari Vaibhavam
 Annamayya Sankeerthana Padanidhi
 Annamayya sankeerthana manihaaram
 Annamayya Vinnapaalu
 Annamayya Madhuragaanam
 Annamayya Venkatadri Govindudu
 Annamayya Sri Krishna Padahela
 Annamayya Sankeerthana Vedanaadam
 Annamayya Aanjaneya Sruti Sanjeevani

 Annamayya Sankeerthana Saamagaanam
 Annamayya Sankeerthana Pranavam
 Annamayya Pada Singaaram
 Annamayya Srinidhi Sankeerthanam
 Annamayya Alamelmanga Vaibhavam
 Krishnaarpana
 Annamayya Paatalu
 Annamayya Vishnu Gaanam
 Annamayya Sankeerthana Sarada
 Annamayya Sankeerthana Sanjeevani
 Flowers at his feet
 Annamayya Sankeerthana Bharati
 Sapthagiri sankeerthanalu
 Hari Siripadahele
 Annamayya Achyta Saranu
 Annamayya Pada ratnaalu
 Annmayya Nrusimha Sankeertanam

Bibliography

T.T.D. Publications

His tunes for Annamayya sankeerthana's has been published by TTD.
 1993 – Annamacharya Sankeerthana Swara Samputi (Telugu)
 1997 – Annamacharya Sankeerthana Manjari (Tamil)
 1999 – Annamacharya Sankeerthana Sankeerthanam (Telugu)
 2000 – Annamacharya Sankeerthana Saurabham (Telugu)
 2001 – Annamacharya Sankeerthana Ratnavali (Telugu)
 2001 – Annamacharya Sankeerthana Swaravali (Tamil)
 2003 – Annamacharya Sankeerthana Praathamiki (Telugu)
 2004 – Annamacharya Sankeerthana Mahati (Telugu)

Other publications
 Krishna Ravali (2 Volumes) (Telugu)
 Anjaneya Kriti Mani Maala (Telugu)
 Annammayya Sankeerthana Sanjeevani (Telugu)

Awards, titles and felicitations

 Tirumala Tirupati Devasthanams (TTD), Tirupati, Asthana Vidwan appointment on 16 November 2012.
 ASTHANA SANGEETHA VIDWAN of Sri Kanchi Kamakoti Peetham, Kanchipuram, Tamil Nadu, Title was awarded on 8 October 2010.
 ANDHRA PRADESH GOVERNMENT UGADI PURASKARAM by the Department of Cultural Affairs, A.P. Government in the year 2007.
 ANNAMAYYA SANKEERTHANA MAHATI, in the year 2001, by T.T.D (on the successful completion of SANKEERTHANA YAGNMAN) at Tirupati, Andhra Pradesh.
 ANNAMAYYA NAADA JYOTHI, in 1997, California, USA, by SVASA (Sri Venkateswara Annamacharya Society of America)
 SRI ANNAMACHARYA VIDWANMANI, in 1997, California, USA, by SAPNA (Sri Annamacharya Project of North America)
 GANAKALA VISAARADA, in 1999, by Cultural wing of State Bank of India, Labbipet, Vijayawada, Andhra Pradesh.
 ANNAMAYYA NAADA SUDHA SAMRAT, in 2003, by Annamayya sankeertaamruta varshini, Hyderabad, Andhra Pradesh.
 ENCHANTING SINGER, in 2001 by Delhi Telugu Academy.
 MASTER M.N. AWARD, in 1998, "World Teachers Trust", an International Organization, Visakhapatnam, Andhra Pradesh.
 SPIRIT OF EXCELLENCE, in 2000, "Academy of Fine Arts", Tirupati, Andhra Pradesh.
 Uttama Purusha, in 2000, Andhra Samskrithika Samithi, Hosuru, Tamil Nadu.
 GURU Sishya Puraskam, in 1998, by "Raaga Saptha Swara", Hyderabad, Andhra Pradesh.
 Ghantasala Laitha Sangeetha Puraskaram, in 2005, by Sri Ghantasala Sangeetha Samsmarana Kalapeetham, Machilipatnam, Andhra Pradesh.
 Harikeerthanacharya, 2006, by State Bank of India, Governorpet, Vijayawada.
 Honoured with Kanakaabhishekam in 2007, during Sankeerthana Yagnam by State Bank of India, Vijayawada, Andhra Pradesh.
 Nandaki Shrignadha Gandharva, in 2006, by Panchaasya Sudharnavam, Hyderabad, Andhra Pradesh.
 Honoured with Suvarna Simha Thallatam, in 2007 by Bhuvaneswara Narayana Peetham, Hyderabad, Andhra Pradesh.
 Lakshagalarchana Saarathi, in 2009, by Surya Peetham, Garividi, Andhra Pradesh.
 "RAJA LAKSHMI FOUNDATION" special award
 "SRI KANCHI KANCHI KAAMAKOTI PEETA" Aasthana vidwaan
 "TIRUMALA TIRUPATI DEVASTANAM" Aasthana vidwaan
 "BEST MUSICIAN FOR 2010 AWARD" by SANAATANA DHARMA charitable trust
 "Dr. MANGALAMPALLI BALAMURALI KRISHNA SANGEETHA PRATIBHA PURASKAARAM"
 "SANKEERTHANA GAANAPAYONIDHI" by R.J.MEDIA

Youtube playlist
https://www.youtube.com/playlist?list=PLCKcZt1sfIJLZ8emWG53C7McbdMgZ31Bu

External links

Interview and Felicitation links
 https://www.youtube.com/watch?v=cNlVWWNLpZs
 https://www.youtube.com/watch?v=3hyjAQTk3xo
 https://www.youtube.com/watch?v=35NFRIs7mW0
 https://www.youtube.com/watch?v=Kq6YrWuOgfs&t=250s
 https://www.youtube.com/watch?v=kEuKfxNnYK0
 https://www.youtube.com/watch?v=Hi1w4pjdqwo
 https://www.youtube.com/watch?v=btQLqGIu6qw&t=185s
 https://www.youtube.com/watch?v=SQ_P7745lCs
 https://www.youtube.com/watch?v=vYOhi4uPeLQ

Hari Sankeerthanam, Bhakti Tv
https://www.youtube.com/watch?v=vYOhi4uPeLQ

Laksha Gala archana
 https://www.youtube.com/watch?v=btQLqGIu6qw&t=185s

References

External links

 Carnatic India
 The Hindu, 24 October 2008

Male Carnatic singers
Carnatic singers
Telugu people
Performers of Hindu music
1948 births
Living people
People from Rajahmundry
Singers from Andhra Pradesh
20th-century Indian male classical singers
21st-century Indian male classical singers
Recipients of the Sangeet Natak Akademi Award